The 13th General Assembly of Prince Edward Island represented the colony of Prince Edward Island between February 3, 1831, and 1835.

The Assembly sat at the pleasure of the Governor of Prince Edward Island, John Ready.  Ewan Cameron was elected speaker. Ready was replaced by Murray Maxwell as Governor later in 1831.

As of 1830, Roman Catholics were allowed to vote and hold office in the colony.

Members

The members of the Prince Edward Island Legislature after the general election of 1831 were:

External links 
 Journal of the House of Assembly of Prince Edward Island (1831)

Terms of the General Assembly of Prince Edward Island
1831 establishments in Prince Edward Island
1835 disestablishments in Prince Edward Island